Stefan Iliev is a Bulgarian sprint canoer who competed in the 1970s. He won a bronze medal in the C-2 10000 m event at the 1975 ICF Canoe Sprint World Championships in Belgrade.

References

Bulgarian male canoeists
Living people
Year of birth missing (living people)
ICF Canoe Sprint World Championships medalists in Canadian